Munif Mohammed Abou Rish was a Palestinian journalist, who is claimed to have planned to assassinate Bob Hawke in the mid-1970s, at the time the federal president of the Australian Labor Party (and future prime minister of Australia).

According to ASIO reports released in 2007, Abou Rish entered Australia on a fake passport provided to the Popular Front for the Liberation of Palestine (PFLP) by Palestinians living in Australia. Abou Rish remained in Australia for three weeks and intended to return  in 1975 to carry out assassinations of Bob Hawke, the Israeli ambassador to Australia, and several prominent Jewish-Australians.

In an interview, the former Palestinian ambassador for Australia and the South Pacific, Ali Kazak, denied the passports were fake and indicated that the PFLP never intended to assassinate Bob Hawke.

References

1974 crimes
Australian people of Palestinian descent
Failed assassins
Australian assassins
Australian journalists
20th-century Australian criminals
Racism in Australia
Palestinian emigrants to Australia
1974 deaths
Year of birth missing